Gastonburg is an unincorporated community in Wilcox County, Alabama, United States, located on Alabama State Route 5.

Geography

Demographics

Gastonburg was listed on the 1910-30 U.S. Censuses as an incorporated town. It disincorporated at some point after 1930.

Notable person
Laurance L. Cross, Presbyterian minister and mayor of Berkeley, California from 1947 to 1955

References

Unincorporated communities in Alabama
Unincorporated communities in Wilcox County, Alabama